David Hoyle may refer to:

 David Hoyle (performance artist) (born 1962), British performance artist, actor and comedian often performing as his character The Divine David
 David Hoyle (priest) (born 1957), Dean of Westminster
 David W. Hoyle (born 1939), North Carolina politician